A Chinese in a Coma is a 2000 Italian comedy film directed by Carlo Verdone.

Plot 
Ercole is a manager in Rome who has to find a new actor for the public, given that his company is in crisis. One day Ercole discovers that his young driver Nicola is very good at telling comic jokes, with little sexual touches, and then he takes advantage of the new idea of a "comedian and sexy" actor to make a success in the entertainment world again. However Nicola, a shy boy, becomes arrogant and spoiled, and slowly destroys the life of his manager.

Cast 
 Carlo Verdone - Ercole Preziosi
 Giuseppe Fiorello - Nicola "Niki" Renda
  - Eva 
 Anna Safroncik - Maruska 
  - Tiepolo
  - Daniela
  - Rudy Sciacca
 Antonia Liskova - Melanie

References

External links 

2000 comedy films
2000 films
Italian comedy films
Films directed by Carlo Verdone
2000s Italian-language films